Kate Pang (born 11 March 1983) is a Singaporean and Taiwanese former actress and television host. She was a full-time Mediacorp artist till 31 October 2017 but continues to film on an ad hoc basis.

Acting career
Pang was a model in Taiwan before going into acting. She impressed during her audition and was given a contract with MediaCorp. Since giving birth to her son in 2014, she has put her career on hold.

Pang is also brand ambassador of Dyson Vacuum Machine (2015), Maxi-Cash: Le Gold (2016) and Maggi Oat Mee (2017).

Pang left MediaCorp on 31 October 2017 with her husband, Andie Chen, but still continues to act and host.

Social media
When Kate Pang and Andie Chen revealed that they were getting married, the Singapore Entertainment Circle coined the term “Kandie” for the couple.

Pang and Chen set up a social media company  in 2016 by the name of Kandie Network, which was changed to Kandie Media in 2017. When baby Aden (A等宝宝) joined the family, Andie and Kate decided to launch their own online video platform "Kandie Family" to share their experiences of bringing up a family in a holistic yet humorous manner.  Kandie Media currently includes Facebook, Instagram and YouTube via the name Kandie Family.

Today, Kandie Family produces a myriad of family oriented programs ranging from cooking to mummy tips and even charity work.

Personal life
Born Pang Xin Yi 庞心怡, she legally changed her name to Kate Pang Lei Xin 庞蕾馨.

Pang is married to fellow actor Andie Chen, her co-star from Joys of Life and Break Free. They dated secretly after first meeting on the set of Joy of Life and married in November 2013. Their son Aden was born in 2014. They were expecting their second child in early 2015 but Pang suffered a miscarriage in April.
The couple also have a daughter, Avery, who was born in 2016.

Filmography

Television

Films

Variety host

Awards and nominations

References

External links
Profile on xin.msn.com

Living people
1983 births
Taiwanese television actresses
Taiwanese television personalities
Singaporean television actresses
Singaporean television personalities